The A46 is a major A road in England. It starts east of Bath, Somerset and ends in Cleethorpes, Lincolnshire, but it does not form a continuous route.  Large portions of the old road have been lost, bypassed, or replaced by motorway development.  Between Leicester and Lincoln the road follows the course of the Roman Fosse Way, but between Bath and Leicester, two cities also linked by the Fosse Way, it follows a more westerly course.

History
It opened in June 1974.

The original (1923) route of the A46 was from Bath to Laceby, passing through Cheltenham, Broadway, Stratford-on-Avon, Coventry, Leicester, Newark and Lincoln.  Unusually for such a long road, no changes were made to its route until the 1970s.  In recent years the central sections of the road have been rerouted and renumbered substantially, and there are now two sections where there are gaps of over  where the road does not exist at all.  The A46 has also been extended from Laceby to Grimsby and Cleethorpes - the road between Laceby and Grimsby was originally part of the A18.

The major realignments have been
Between Coventry and Leicester the original road was downgraded to the B4065 and the B4114 as a result of the opening of the M69 motorway in 1977.
Between Cheltenham and Stratford-on-Avon the road was realigned in the 1980s through Evesham on the former route of the A435 and A439.  The original route through some of the most picturesque parts of the Cotswold Hills was downgraded to the B4632.
The route was subsequently cut between Cheltenham and Teddington and that section became the A435 again.  The A46 was diverted to connect with the M5 motorway on part of the former route of the A438.
Between Evesham and north of Stratford the route was again realigned to run by Alcester and by-pass Stratford, partly on the former line of the A422.  The previous route through Bidford-on-Avon to Stratford became the B439, and north of Stratford the old route became the A439.
A new alignment was built from Junction 21a of the M1 to by-pass Leicester to the north.  The old route through Leicester was redesignated the A5460 (Narborough Road, in the southwest) and A607 (Belgrave Road/Melton Road, in the northeast).  The A607 deviates from the straight course of the Fosse Way, bypassing the village centres of Thurmaston and Syston.
The A46 was realigned to by-pass Warwick, Kenilworth and Coventry, and the old route was redesignated the A429 and the A4600.

Bypasses were also built around Market Rasen, Lincoln and Newark.

Route

Cleethorpes - A1 (Newark)
The A46 starts at Isaac's Hill roundabout with the A1098 and the A180. It meets the A1031 at a roundabout and passes the King George V Stadium on the right. It meets the B1213 from the right, then crosses the A16 Peaks Parkway where it gains primary status. It heads into Grimsby, meeting the A1243 Bargate (former A16). It meets the B1444 where the road becomes a dual carriageway. It meets the A18 at a roundabout. This was the old terminus of the A46, and what is now the A46 heading east into Grimsby used to be the A18. The road becomes the single carriageway road once again and runs alongside the north part of the Lincolnshire Wolds. It bypasses Irby upon Humber and enters the East Midlands. It bypasses Swallow to the North. It climbs a hill to meet the B1225, A1173, and A1084 just east of Caistor. The road crosses the Nottingham - Grimsby railway at a level crossing. The road becomes very straight and flat, passing through Middle Rasen Plantation and meets the A1103 from the right. The A631 leaves to the right at a T junction. The road bypasses Dunholme to the south then it passes close to the former RAF Dunholme Lodge. It passes the headquarters for Lincolnshire Police on the left. It meets the A158 (for Skegness) and the B1182 (former route into Lincoln) at a roundabout.

The A46 Lincoln Relief Road is concurrent with the A15. The A15 leaves to the right at a roundabout. The road becomes dual carriageway and traverses the Lincoln Cliff. It meets the A57 at the Carholme roundabout and crosses the Lincoln - Gainsborough railway. After bypassing Lincoln, it starts following the route of the old Fosse Way (bar bypasses). The A46 passes the former airfield of RAF Swinderby. The road enters Nottinghamshire and the road bypasses Brough. The new section of road finishes at the roundabout with the A1133. The A17 joins from the left at a roundabout.

A1 (Newark) - M1 (Leicester)

The road crosses the A1. Newark is bypassed to the North and West ending on a roundabout with the B6166. The road continues south-west, meeting the A6097 and A52 near Bingham. The single carriageway section between Newark and the Widmerpool A606 junction was replaced by a new dual carriageway road which was completed in April 2012. Heading South from the A606 junction, the existing dual carriageway still following the route of the Fosse Way.  The road crosses the A6006 North of Six Hills. Syston is bypassed to the West, and at a roundabout with the A607 the route continues in a Westerly direction onto the Leicester Western Bypass.  There are grade separated junctions with the A6, A5630 and A50. This section of the road ends at a junction with the B5380, with the forward route flowing on to the M1. It originally continued towards Coventry until the opening of the M69 motorway in the 1970s, which replaced the A46 as the main route between Leicester and Coventry, with the former A46 being downgraded.

M6 (Coventry) - M5 (Tewkesbury)

The A46 reappears at Coventry at junction 2 of the M6, it follows the boundary between the district of Rugby and the borough of Coventry, always staying inside Warwickshire. At Binley Woods the A428 is crossed at a roundabout. The next roundabout is the signal controlled Tollbar Roundabout, where there are exits for the A45 and Coventry Airport. There is a break in the road here, and it resumes again at Festival Island where it takes the southern exit on to the three-lane Kenilworth bypass. Along the bypass there are exits for Stoneleigh and the University of Warwick, Kenilworth and Leamington Spa (A452). At the Warwick (A429) exit, the bypass drops down to two lanes, closely followed by an exit for the A4177 and Warwick Parkway railway station. The M40 is passed over west of Longbridge roundabout, as a new bypass now brings the mainline carriageway away from Junction 15, the A46 meets a small roundabout, connecting with the B4463 and a link to Junction 15 for northbound A46 traffic to access the M40 and A429 respectively.

The  dual carriageway section south of the improved Longbridge island is the only part of the A46 on its original routing between Leicester and Cheltenham. Stratford is bypassed to the north as a single carriageway road, crossing the A3400 and meeting the A422. Between here and Alcester the A46 is concurrent with the A422, with the A46 taking priority. Alcester is bypassed to the south of the town. At a roundabout the A435 leaves to the North for Redditch and Birmingham. The A46 takes a dual carriageway route to the south towards Evesham, meeting the B439 at a roundabout near Bidford on Avon. Almost immediately after the roundabout, the road enters Worcestershire and Wychavon district, then goes back into Warwickshire, before going back into Worcestershire Near Harvington. At the northern end of the Evesham bypass, the A44 joins at a roundabout and becomes concurrent with the A46. The next roundabout on the bypass is the B4035, followed by the A44 (for Oxford), The final roundabout on the bypass is with the A4184 and the A46 continues to head south. The villages of Sedgeberrow (bypassed) and Beckford are on the route. At the Teddington Hands roundabout, the A435 heads south to Cheltenham, while the A46 heads west. It passes Ashchurch close to Ashchurch for Tewkesbury railway station. This section of the A46 ends on the M5 roundabout at junction 9.

Cheltenham - Bath

After a gap filled in by the A435, the A46 reappears on its original route in the centre of Cheltenham. It then heads through Stroud, through Nailsworth, to the M4 motorway, where since 2003 access to the roundabout has been controlled by traffic lights. From the M4, the A46 heads to Bath, ending at its junction with the A4 to the east of the city. 

The  £45 million dual-carriageway Batheaston/Swainswick Bypass, opened in summer 1996, contains  of the A46. In February 1994, a camp was set up on Solsbury Hill, to protest the Batheaston bypass, however this was ultimately unsuccessful and construction completed by November 1995.

A small section of the A46 between Painswick and Stroud subsided during the floods on Friday 29 July 2007 and was shut for over 6 months, causing quite an impact on the local area. The road re-opened on 15 February 2008.

Former routes

Bypasses and realignments
 Irby upon Humber (Bypassed, now Old Main Road)
 Swallow (Bypassed, now Caistor-Grimsby Road)
 Lincoln (Bypassed, now A1434)
 Newark (Bypassed, now B6166)
 Syston (Bypassed, now unclassified)
 Leicester (Bypassed, now A607 and A5460)
 Coventry (Bypassed; southern section now A429 [pre-1974 route], or A444 and A4114 [1974 — 1989 route]; northern section A4600)
 Kenilworth and Warwick (Bypassed, now A429)
 Stratford (Bypassed, now A439 and B439)

Downgrading
 Leicester - Coventry (Downgraded to B4114 upon opening of the M69)
 Stratford - Cheltenham (Downgraded to B4632 upon diversion of route via Alcester and Evesham)

Improvements
 The M40 Longbridge Island bypass, a dual carriageway road which bypassed the M40 Junction 15 interchange, opened in December 2009, providing much needed relief for the junction.
Spring 2012 saw peripheral works progress and the entire project was completed by Summer 2012.
 The A45/A46 Tollbar End improvement is now complete and provides a grade separated junction, as well as improvements to the Stonebridge Highway. The project was open to traffic in December 2016.

Proposed

 The A46/A428 Binley Junction Upgrade will provide a grade separated junction. The project is currently under public consultation.

 The Sub-national Transport Body Midlands Connect prioritised the upgrading of the A46 in the Midlands Connect Strategy, published in March 2017, including a strategic study for a potential expressway route between the M5 and M40. In July 2018, Midlands Connect released "Our Routes to Growth" in which it described the first stage of its A46 corridor study, referring to the road as a "national and international economic driver that connects the East and West Midlands to the South West and the North. Investing in infrastructure improvements along this route will create a resilient alternative to the existing motorway network for businesses and freight traffic." It reiterated the development a business case for upgrades to the A46 from the M40 to Syston and a strategic study for making the A46 an expressway between the M5 and M40. The first stage of this A46 study will be released before the end of 2018, with the second stage examining specific sections for more detailed development of possible improvements.

Upcoming

 The junction with Lincoln Road near Welton has a high accident rate. In 2017, and information event was held by Lincolnshire County Council about the junction's potential replacement with a three-armed roundabout. The plans were approved over the course of 2017–2019, with legal orders approved by the Secretary of State in December 2019. As of February 2020, clearance work has started, and the projected is expected to be finished in Spring 2021. 
Newark Bypass - will upgrade road to dual carriageway. Scheme expected to be completed by 2030.

References

External links

 SABRE First 99 - A46
 Workmen dig up Roman treasure when improving A46
 Red Arrows salute opening of the Newark to Lincoln Improvement

Borough of Charnwood
Kenilworth
Newark and Sherwood
Borough of North East Lincolnshire
North Kesteven District
Roads in Coventry
Roads in England
Roads in Gloucestershire
Roads in Lincolnshire
Roads in Somerset
Roads in Warwickshire
Roads in Worcestershire
Stratford-on-Avon District
Transport in Leicestershire
Transport in Rushcliffe
Warwick District
West Lindsey District